Frig is a French film directed by Antony Hickling in 2018. The film was premiered at the Etrange Festival in Paris at the Forum des images. Frig had a cinema release at St André des Arts cinema in Paris, France 2018.

Plot
Frig is divided into three parts (Love, Shit and Sperm) and is presented as an experimental fiction beginning at the end of a romantic relationship. The film is the third and final part of the trilogy by Antony Hickling, consisting of Little Gay Boy, Where Horses Go to Die and concluding with Frig. The film was inspired by 120 Days of Sodom by Marquis de Sade.

Cast
 Biño Sauitzvy 
 Magali Gaudou
 Luc Bruyere
 Christine Mingo
 Thomas Laroppe
 Gaëtan Vettier
 Arthur Gillet
 André Schneider

Awards
The Trilogy (Where Horses Go To Die, Little Gay Boy, & Frig) receives the Christian Petermann award for an innovative work. Controversial scenarios expressed through music, dance and daring at the IV DIGO – Goias Sexual diversity and gender international Film Festival, Brazil, 2019
Special Mention for his work as a director at Rio FICG, Brazil, 2015

References

External links
 

2018 films
Films set in Paris
French LGBT-related films
2010s French films